Abatement refers generally to a lessening, diminution, reduction, or moderation; specifically, it may refer to:

 421-a tax abatement, property tax exemption in the U.S. state of New York
 Abatement of debts and legacies, a common law doctrine of wills
 Abatement in pleading, a legal defense to civil and criminal actions
 Abatement (heraldry), a modification of the shield or coat of arms imposed by authority for misconduct
 Asbestos abatement, removal of asbestos from structures
 Bird abatement, driving or removing undesired birds from an area
 Dust abatement, the process of inhibiting the creation of excess soil dust
 Graffiti abatement, a joint effort between groups to eliminate graffiti
 Marginal abatement cost, the marginal cost of reducing pollution
 Noise abatement, strategies to reduce noise pollution or its impact
 Nuisance abatement, regulatory compliance methodology
 Tax abatement, temporary reduction or elimination of a tax

See also
 Abate (disambiguation)